Lectionary 113, designated by siglum ℓ 113 (in the Gregory-Aland numbering) is a Greek manuscript of the New Testament, on parchment leaves. Palaeographically it has been assigned to the 13th century.

Description 

The codex contains lessons from the Gospels of John, Matthew, Luke lectionary (Evangelistarium) with lacunae at the end. It is written in Greek minuscule letters, on 341 parchment leaves, in 2 columns per page, 19 lines per page.

Prefixed are verses of Arsenius, Archbishop of Monembasia, addressed to Clement VII (1523-1534).

History 

The first 213 leaves were written in the 13th century. The leaves 214-341 were supplemented in the 14th century (or 15th century) by George.

The manuscript once belonged to Arsenius, Archbishop of Monembasia in the Morea (as codex 333.

The manuscript was added to the list of New Testament manuscripts by Scholz. 

The manuscript is not cited in the critical editions of the Greek New Testament (UBS3).

Currently the codex is located in the Biblioteca Laurentiana (Plutei VI.2) in Florence.

See also 

 List of New Testament lectionaries
 Biblical manuscript
 Textual criticism

Notes and references

Bibliography 
 
 

Greek New Testament lectionaries
13th-century biblical manuscripts
14th-century biblical manuscripts